Beausite is a commune in the Meuse department in the Grand Est region in northeastern France.

The former towns of Amblaincourt, Deuxnouds-devant-Beauzée, and Seraucourt were joined to Beauzée-sur-Aire on 1 December 1972, which subsequently changed its name to Beausite on 1 January 1973.

Population

See also
Communes of the Meuse department

References

Communes of Meuse (department)
Three Bishoprics